Mouhanad Khorchide (born September 6, 1971, in Beirut) is an Austrian sociologist and Islamic theologian, teaching as a professor at the University of Münster in Germany.

Personal life and studies 
Khorchide was raised in Saudi Arabia where his Palestinian family had fled to. At the age of 18 he emigrated to Vienna, Austria. There, he studied sociology and soon became a citizen of Austria. Parallel to his studies in Austria, Khorchide studied Islamic studies in Beirut. The scientific advisory board of the Austrian Documentation Center for Political Islam is headed by Khorchide.

2006-2010 he worked at the University of Vienna in the fields of Islamic studies and Islamic pedagogy. Parallel to this, he was Imam of a mosque near Vienna.

In 2010 Khorchide became a professor at the University of Münster in Germany, at the Centre for Islamic Theology (CIT).

Research 
The central tenet of Khorchide's teachings is that at the heart of Islam there is mercy, not blind obedience to traditions or even violence. For Khorchide, true Islam has no contradiction to the ideals of humanism as known in the Western world. He reads the Quran as a text from the 7th century and rejects direct transfers of its moral teachings directly to the 21st century. Khorchide wants to read the Quran and the hadith by applying the historical-critical method. According to him, this will not harm the real message of Islam but will support a better understanding of Islam.

With his approach, Khorchide attracted international attention. The New York Times wrote about him, and delegations from Islamic countries visited Münster in order to understand more about his approach to Islamic theology. In 2016, the Grand Imam of al-Azhar Ahmed el-Tayeb, who is considered by some Muslims to be the highest authority in Sunni Islam, came to Münster and talked with Mouhanad Khorchide.

The major Muslim associations in Germany reject Khorchide's approach, or at least look at it with much suspicion. Khorchide received death threats which is why he is living under the protection of the police.

Mouhanad Khorchide is one of the founders of the Muslimisches Forum Deutschland, i.e. Muslim Forum Germany of liberal Muslims and non-Muslims.

He is regularly interviewed in the major German media outlets on topics around Islam, esp. since the US withdrawal from Afghanistan.

See also 
 Liberal and Progressive Muslim movements
 Islam in Germany

Works 
 Islam is Mercy: Essential Features of a Modern Religion 2014.  
 German: Islam ist Barmherzigkeit. Grundzüge einer modernen Religion 2012.
 Scharia – der missverstandene Gott. Der Weg zu einer modernen islamischen Ethik 2013.
 Gott glaubt an den Menschen: Mit dem Islam zu einem neuen Humanismus 2015.

As editor:
 with Klaus von Stosch: Herausforderungen an die islamische Theologie in Europa. Challenges for Islamic theology in Europe 2012.
 with Marco Schöller: Das Verhältnis zwischen Islamwissenschaft und islamischer Theologie. Beiträge der Konferenz Münster, 1.-2. Juli 2011 2012.

External links 
 Prof. Dr. Mouhanad Khorchide at the Centre for Islamic Theology (CIT) at the University of Münster.
 Mouhanad Khorchide's Reformist Theology: De-politicizing the Koran in Qantara 2013.
 "God is not a Dictator" Interview in Qantara 2012.
 Dispute about Prof Mouhanad Khorchide: A conflict of many layers in Qantara 2014.
 Teaching Islam’s ‘Forgotten’ Side as Germany Changes in New York Times January 9, 2015.

References 

1971 births
20th-century Muslim theologians
Living people
21st-century Muslim theologians
Austrian sociologists
Academic staff of the University of Münster
Academic staff of the University of Vienna